CIRA may refer to:
Canadian Internet Registration Authority
Centre d'interprétation et de reconnaissance acoustique of the French Navy (la Marine nationale française)
Centre International de Recherches sur l'Anarchisme (CIRA), library of anarchist material  in Lausanne, Switzerland
Central Illinois Regional Airport, a public airport in McLean County, Illinois
Centro Italiano Ricerche Aerospaziali, the Italian Aerospace Research Centre
Certified Insolvency and Restructuring Advisor designated by the Association of Insolvency & Restructuring Advisors of Medford, Oregon, United States.
Client Initiated Remote Access, a remote access technology from Intel
Comprehensive Immigration Reform Act, Senate Proposed Legislation, S. 2611
Continuity Irish Republican Army
Cooperative Institute for Research in the Atmosphere, Colorado State University
Yale University Center for Interdisciplinary Research on AIDS (CIRA)
CIRA, COSPAR international reference atmosphere, an empirical model of the upper atmosphere
CIRA-FM, a French language Canadian radio station in Montreal, Quebec